is a former Japanese football player. She played for Japan national team.

Club career
Omatsu was born on July 12, 1970. She played for Nikko Securities Dream Ladies. The club won L.League championship and she was selected Best Eleven for 3 years in a row (1996-1998). However, the club was disbanded in 1998 due to financial strain. She moved to OKI FC Winds in 1999. However the club was disbanded end of season.

National team career
On June 8, 1997, Omatsu debuted for Japan national team against China. She played at 1997 AFC Championship. She was also a member of Japan for 1999 World Cup. She played 12 games and scored 1 goal for Japan until 1999.

National team statistics

References

External links
 

1970 births
Living people
Place of birth missing (living people)
Japanese women's footballers
Japan women's international footballers
Nadeshiko League players
Nikko Securities Dream Ladies players
OKI FC Winds players
1999 FIFA Women's World Cup players
Women's association football forwards